The Gundecha Brothers are Indian classical singers of the dhrupad genre of the Dagar vani. From 1985 to 2019 the duo consisted of brothers Umakant Gundecha and Ramakant Gundecha and were awarded the Padma Shri for art for 2012. Following the death of  Ramakant Gundecha in 2019, his son Anant began to perform with Umakant in the Gundecha bandhu.

Early life and background
They studied at the local Madhav Music College. Umakant has a post-graduate degree in music and economics and the younger Ramakant in music and commerce.

They moved to Bhopal in 1981 for training in Dhrupad music under Zia Fariduddin Dagar and his brother Zia Mohiuddin Dagar. Both gurus were second cousins of the two major Dhrupad forces in the second half of the 20th century; two duos known as the senior Dagar Brothers (Nasir Moinuddin & Nasir Aminuddin) and the junior Dagar Brothers (Nasir Zahiruddin & Nasir Faiyazuddin) respectively.

Ramakant Gundecha died in Bhopal on 8 November 2019 from a heart attack at the age of 57. He was married and had a son. He was cremated on 9 November 2019 in Bhopal.

Career

After training for four years, they performed in public for the first time in May 1985, at the Uttaradhikar dance and music festival in Bhopal. They have worked to expand the dhrupad repertoire by incorporating texts by Hindi poets such as Tulsidas, Padmakar and Nirala.  

The Gundecha Brothers also sing the Dhrupad compositions of India's senior Kathak exponent Mahamahopadhyay Dr. Pandit Puru Dadheech, in particular, his famous Shankar Pralayankar composition.

They have set up a Dhrupad institute outside Bhopal where they teach students from all over the world. They run a music school in the Dhrupad tradition, according to the guru-shishya style of teaching that is prevalent in India for teaching of the arts.

Recordings and fellowships

They have recorded many cassettes and CDs by H.M.V., Music Today, Rhythm House,  IPPNW Concerts Berlin, Navras and  Audio Rec London. They have also sung for many television channels in India and have been broadcast on British, U.S., German and French Radio as well. As well as being an integral part of  all of India's prestigious music festivals, the  brothers have also performed at many important international music festivals and institutions in Europe, U.S.A., Australia, Singapore, Bangladesh, U.A.E. and Hong Kong.	

They have received M.P. Govt. Scholarship from 1981 to 1985, National Fellowship from 1987 to '89, Ustad Allauddin Khan Fellowship in 1993, Sanskriti Award in 1994  and  Kumar Gandharva Award in 1998 by Govt. of Madhaya Pradesh and Dagar Gharana Award by Mewar Foundation in 2001.

Awards

 National Fellowship 1987–89
 Ustad Allauddin Khan Fellowship 1993
 Sanskriti Award 1994
 Kumar Gandharva Award by Government of Madhya Pradesh 1998
 Dagar Gharana Award by Mewar Foundation 2001
 Rajat Kamal—National Film Award for Best Music Direction 2006
 Puttaraj Gawai Award from Puttaraj Gawai Pratishthan, Dharwad 2010
 Padma Shri by Government of India 2012
 Spandan Sammaan 2016
 Shrimati Vatsala Joshi Samman 2016
 Lifetime Achievement Award by Union Bank 2017
 Madhya Pradesh Gaurav Samman 2017
 Sangeet Natak Akademi Award 2017
 Swati Tirunal Samman 2018

Controversy
On 4 September 2020, a student of Dhrupad Sansthan (training school run by Gundecha brothers) accused the late Ramakant Gundecha and Akhilesh Gundecha of sexual abuse. Following this event, several more students came forward with their allegations of abuse in discussions with the media.  The school announced Akhilesh Gundecha would be stepping down while the accusations were investigated by the internal committee. 

As part of an internal probe conducted by the institution, an ICC was constituted to investigate the allegations. 
The ICC passed adverse recommendations against Akhilesh Gundecha. Among many other recommendations, it advised reconstitution of the institute's board of trustees to include a majority of non-family members,as well as penalties on the institute, disciplinary action and measures for reparation.

The Gundecha Brothers approached the Madhya Pradesh high court challenging the ICC report and recommendations.

In response,12 women filed an intervening application in support of the ICC.

Discography

Rhythm House (MCs):

 Vol. 1, Raag- Bhimpalasi, Gurjari Todi, Malkauns
 Vol. 2, Raag- Bihag, Madhumad Sarang, Sohni

Music Today (MCs and CDs)

 Bhaktimala / Rama – Vol. 1
 Bhaktimala/ Shiva – Vol. 1
 Bhaktimala/ Hanumana – Vol. 2
 Bhaktimala/ Ganesh – Vol. 1
 Young Masters -Vol.1
 Raga – Shyam Kalyan and Jaijaiwanti

HMV (MCs and CDs)
Naad Sugandh

 Vol. 1, Raga – Bhupali, Puriya Dhanashri, Shankara
 Vol. 2, Raga- Jounpuri, Megh, Komal Rishabh Asawari

Raga – Bihag, Night Melody- Raga
IPPNW – CONCERTS, Germany −1995

Raga- Darbari, Audio Rec – UK −1998
Navras- UK (CD) – Raag- Yaman and Charukeshi 	
Isha Music – Durga Kavach 	
Raga- Komal Rishabh Asawari – Dhrupad Vocal, Sundaram Records- 2003
DARSHAN
Raga – Komal Rishabh Asawari
Sense world Music, UK – 2003
	
Raga- Bhairava – Dhrupad Vocal, Sundaram Records- 2003
Dhrupad- Live of 19th Tokyo Summer Festival
Arion Edo Foundation and Intoxicate Records
DVD – Raga- Miyan Malhar, Megh, Shivaranjani,
Malkouns, Adana
Manthan- Lecture Demonstration on Dhrupad
SPIC MACAY COMMUNICATIONS-2005
Raga- Miyan Malhar– Dhrupad Vocal
Raga Bageshri
Raga Bilaskhani Todi
Sundaram Records- 2004
Sacred Chants of Jainism: Bhaktamar Stotra – 2006

References

External links

Official site
An interview of the Gundecha Brothers
Article on Gundecha Brothers
Interview/Talk with Gundecha Bandhu

 

Living people
Hindustani singers
Dagarvani
Musicians from Bhopal
Sibling musical duos
Indian musical duos

Indian musical groups
People from Ujjain
Recipients of the Padma Shri in arts
Musical groups established in 1985
Singers from Madhya Pradesh
20th-century Indian singers
21st-century Indian singers
Year of birth missing (living people)
1985 establishments in India
Recipients of the Sangeet Natak Akademi Award